Night Nurse Ingeborg (German: Nachtschwester Ingeborg) is a 1958 West German drama film directed by Géza von Cziffra and starring Ewald Balser, Claus Biederstaedt and Immy Schell.

The film's sets were designed by the art directors Dieter Bartels and Johannes Ott.

Cast
 Ewald Balser as Prof. Burger 
 Claus Biederstaedt as Dr. Manfred Burger 
 Immy Schell as Ingeborg Roeder 
 Camilla Spira as Frau Roeder 
 Ilse Steppat as Frau Burger 
 Franz Schafheitlin as Oberarzt Dr. Ranzau 
 Franziska Kinz as Oberschwester Mathilde 
 Renate Küster as Schwester Gerti 
 Bruno Dallansky as Dr. Hans Markwitz 
 Gudrun Thielemann as Schwester Erna 
 Bum Krüger as Patient Breitmeier 
 Robert Meyn
 Renate Kalin as Schwester Anna 
 Erik Frey as Dozent Birkel 
 Karl Meixner as Patient Krause 
 Max Walter Sieg as Patient Bienert 
 Horst Beck
 Gerhard Niemitz

References

Bibliography
 Rentschler, Eric. The Ministry of Illusion: Nazi Cinema and Its Afterlife. Harvard University Press, 1996.

External links 
 

1958 films
1958 romantic drama films
German romantic drama films
West German films
1950s German-language films
Films directed by Géza von Cziffra
German black-and-white films
Films set in hospitals
1950s German films